Atelopus carbonerensis, also known as the Venezuelan yellow frog and La Carbonera stubfoot toad (in Spanish: ranita amarilla de La Carbonera), is a species of toad in the family Bufonidae. It is endemic to the Mérida Andes of Venezuela. It was last observed in 1998 and is now likely extinct, or, at very best, the remaining population is very small.

Description
Adult males measure  and adult females  in snout–vent length. The snout is projecting. The hindlimbs are long. Dorsal coloration is yellow with brown spots around the nostrils and, occasionally, on other parts of the body. The anterior part of the belly is scarlet red. There are dorsolateral rows of tubercles and a few scattered tubercles dorsally.

Habitat and conservation
Individuals have been found along streams, in which the tadpoles develop.

This species was once abundant, but declined drastically in the 1980s. The last confirmed observation is from 1998. There are unconfirmed later observations, but targeted searches have not resulted in new sightings. The decline is probably caused by chytridiomycosis in combination with other factors, particularly habitat loss – little of the original cloud forest at the type locality remains. The range of this species is partly within the Sierra La Culata National Park.

References

carbonerensis
Amphibians of the Andes
Amphibians of Venezuela
Endemic fauna of Venezuela
Taxa named by Juan A. Rivero
Amphibians described in 1972
Taxonomy articles created by Polbot